Talat Khwan is one of the ten subdistricts (tambon) of Mueang Nonthaburi District, in Nonthaburi Province, Thailand. The subdistrict is bounded by (clockwise from north) Bang Kraso, Bang Khen and Suan Yai subdistricts. The whole area of the subdistrict is covered by Nonthaburi City Municipality. In 2020 it had a total population of 47,695 people.

References

External links
Website of Nonthaburi City Municipality

Tambon of Nonthaburi province
Populated places in Nonthaburi province